Hypsoblennius is a genus of combtooth blennies found in the Pacific and Atlantic Oceans.

Species
There are currently 16 recognized species in this genus:
 Hypsoblennius brevipinnis (Günther, 1861) (Barnaclebill blenny)
 Hypsoblennius caulopus (C. H. Gilbert, 1898) (Tidepool blenny)
 Hypsoblennius digueti Chabanaud, 1943
 Hypsoblennius exstochilus J. E. Böhlke, 1959 (Longhorn blenny)
 Hypsoblennius gentilis (Girard, 1854) (Bay blenny)
 Hypsoblennius gilberti (D. S. Jordan, 1882) (Rockpool blenny)
 Hypsoblennius hentz (Lesueur, 1825) (Feather blenny)
 Hypsoblennius invemar Smith-Vaniz & Acero P., 1980 (Tessellated blenny)
 Hypsoblennius ionthas (D. S. Jordan & C. H. Gilbert, 1882) (Freckled blenny)
 Hypsoblennius jenkinsi (D. S. Jordan & Evermann, 1896) (Mussel blenny)
 Hypsoblennius maculipinna (Regan, 1903)  
 Hypsoblennius paytensis (Steindachner, 1876)   
 Hypsoblennius proteus (Krejsa, 1960) (Socorro blenny)
 Hypsoblennius robustus Hildebrand, 1946  
 Hypsoblennius sordidus (E. T. Bennett, 1828) 
 Hypsoblennius striatus (Steindachner, 1876) (Striated blenny)

References

 
Salarinae
Marine fish genera